The events of 1968 in anime.

Releases

See also
1968 in animation

Births
 February 2 - Michael Arias, film director, producer, visual effects artist

External links 
Japanese animated works of the year, listed in the IMDb

Anime
Anime
Years in anime